The Taesongsan Funfair() is an amusement park located in Taesong-guyok, 12 kilometers from Pyongyang, North Korea. It was opened in 1977 and is at the foot of Mount Taesong. Total area is 180,000m2, and contains 16 different rides.

See also 
 List of amusement parks in North Korea

References

External links 
 
Taesongsan Funfair at the Roller Coaster DataBase

Amusement parks opened in 1977
Amusement parks in Pyongyang
1977 establishments in North Korea